The men's decathlon event at the 1999 European Athletics U23 Championships was held in Göteborg, Sweden, at Ullevi on 29 and 30 July 1999.

Medalists

Results

Final
29-30 July

Participation
According to an unofficial count, 13 athletes from 9 countries participated in the event.

 (1)
 (1)
 (3)
 (1)
 (1)
 (3)
 (1)
 (1)
 (1)

References

Decathlon
Combined events at the European Athletics U23 Championships